Emerson "Pink" Hawley (December 5, 1872 – September 19, 1938) was an American professional baseball player who pitched in the Major Leagues from 1892 to 1901. Hawley played for the St. Louis Browns, Cincinnati Reds, New York Giants, Pittsburgh Pirates, and Milwaukee Brewers.

Hawly died at his home in Beaver Dam, Wisconsin in 1938.

See also
 List of Major League Baseball annual shutout leaders
 List of Major League Baseball career hit batsmen leaders

References

External links

1872 births
1938 deaths
19th-century baseball players
Major League Baseball pitchers
St. Louis Browns (NL) players
Pittsburgh Pirates players
Cincinnati Reds players
New York Giants (NL) players
Milwaukee Brewers (1901) players
Minor league baseball managers
Milwaukee Brewers (minor league) players
Buffalo Bisons (minor league) players
La Crosse Pinks players
Baseball players from Wisconsin
Sportspeople from the Milwaukee metropolitan area
People from Beaver Dam, Wisconsin
Burials in Wisconsin